Kheper is a subgenus of Scarabaeus: the typical genus of scarab beetles in the tribe Scarabaeini. The genus name honors the god Khepri in the ancient Egyptian religion, who is depicted as having a scarab for a head. Kheper can be found on the border between Botswana, Namibia, and South Africa in the arid sand dunes. This genus of scarab beetles share a family with the oldest and most revered scarab beetles, the Scarabaeus sacer.

References

Scarabaeinae
Insect subgenera